The Ishikawajima Ne-20 was Japan's first turbojet engine. It was developed during World War II in parallel with the nation's first military jet, the Nakajima Kikka.

Design and development
The decision to manufacture this engine came about because of the unsuitability of two earlier powerplants selected for the Kikka, the Tsu-11 and the Ne-12. The Ne-20 was made possible by Imperial Japanese Navy engineer Eichi Iwaya obtaining photographs and a single cut-away drawing of the German BMW 003 engine.

Only a small number of these engines, perhaps fifty, were produced before the end of the war. Two of them were used to power the Kikka on its only flight on August 7, 1945. Only a few of the engines under construction survived. It was also planned to use the engine to power a version of the Ohka kamikaze weapon, but this was not implemented before the end of the war.

Variants
Ne-20Standard production engines
Ne-20-Kai Up-rated version

Engines on display

Three Ne-20s have been preserved to the present day, one at Ishikawajima-Harima's internal company museum in Tanashi, and two at the Smithsonian's National Air and Space Museum in Washington, DC.

Specifications (Ne-20)

See also

References

Bibliography

External links

 Kugisho Ne-20, Naval Air Technical Arsenal, Turbojet Engine -National Air and Space Museum

1940s turbojet engines
Ne-20